Gamal El-Din Sabri (born 21 June 1915, date of death unknown) was an Egyptian basketball player. He competed in the men's tournament at the 1936 Summer Olympics.

References

External links

1915 births
Year of death missing
Egyptian men's basketball players
Olympic basketball players of Egypt
Basketball players at the 1936 Summer Olympics
Place of birth missing